Brianna Coda (born January 14, 2001) is an American professional wrestler. She is signed to WWE, performing on the NXT brand under the ring name Cora Jade, where she is a former NXT Women's Tag Team Champion. 

Before signing to WWE, she previously wrestled on the independent circuit under the ring name Elayna Black, and made appearances in All Elite Wrestling (AEW) and Impact Wrestling.

Professional wrestling career

Early career (2018–2021)

Coda first trained at the Freelance Wrestling Academy by Bryce Benjamin and Isaias Velazquez. She debuted on December 9, 2018, in the Illinois-based Kaiju Attack Wrestling promotion in a tag team match against her former instructor Bryce Benjamin under the ring name Elayna Black. On July 11, 2019, Black won her first tournament while in ZOWA Live, becoming the 2019 Zen Of Women's Athletics Tournament Champion. On August 15 while in Zelo Pro Wrestling, Black competed in a four-way match for the vacant Zelo Pro Women's Championship. On September 1, Black competed in Rise Wrestling's 2019 Regional Rising Stars Tournament where she was eliminated in the quarter final by Sophie King. She also appeared in Shimmer Women Athletes, debuting in Volume 118 competing in a scramble match.

Impact Wrestling (2019)
On October 18, 2019, Black made her pay-per-view debut while in Impact Wrestling at Prelude to Glory, where she lost to Havok in a squash match.

All Elite Wrestling (2020)
Black first appeared for All Elite Wrestling (AEW) on the October 13 episode of Dark losing to Red Velvet. She returned the following month on the November 3 episode of Dark, teaming with Leyla Hirsch in a tag match but lost to the team of Brandi Rhodes and Red Velvet.

WWE (2021–present)
On January 20, 2021, it was announced that Coda signed a contract with WWE and would wrestle on the NXT brand. She debuted on the January 22 episode of 205 Live under the ring name Cora Jade, where she was paired with Gigi Dolin in the opening round of the 2021 Women's Dusty Rhodes Tag Team Classic, but they were eliminated by Candice LeRae and Indi Hartwell.

On November 16, she joined Raquel González's team for WarGames. At that event, she gave her team the victory in the women's WarGames match. Two weeks later, she got an opportunity at the NXT Women's Championship in a triple threat match against González and champion Mandy Rose at New Year's Evil, but failed to win the title. At The Great American Bash, Jade and her new tag team partner Roxanne Perez defeated Dolin and Jacy Jayne to become the NXT Women's Tag Team Champions. On the July 12, 2022, episode of NXT, Jade turned heel when she attacked Perez, costing her the NXT Women's Championship match against Mandy Rose. The following week, Jade declared her intentions for solo success and then dropped her title belt in the trash can, leaving Perez as the sole tag champion. Later that night, she competed in a 20-woman battle royal to determine the number one contender to the NXT Women's Championship, but was eliminated by eventual winner Zoey Stark. At Heatwave, Jade defeated Perez. On the October 4 episode of NXT, a Weapons Wild match was set between Jade and Perez on Halloween Havoc. The two also agreed on pick your poison matches, where both could choose any opponent in WWE for each other. Jade made her first main roster appearance on the October 17 episode of Raw, where she picked Rhea Ripley as Perez's opponent. The following night, she defeated Raquel Rodriguez (Perez's handpicked opponent) by disqualification. Four days later, at Halloween Havoc, Jade lost to Perez in a Weapons Wild match.

Other media 
Coda made her video game debut as a playable character in WWE 2K23.

Personal life
Coda previously dated fellow professional wrestler Trey Baxter. She is now in a relationship with fellow NXT wrestler Bron Breakker.

Championships and accomplishments
 Pro Wrestling Illustrated
 Ranked No. 83 of the top 150 female singles wrestlers in the PWI Women's 100 in 2022
 WWE
 NXT Women's Tag Team Championship (1 time) – with Roxanne Perez

References

External links

 
 
 
 

2001 births
Living people
21st-century American women
21st-century professional wrestlers
American female professional wrestlers
Professional wrestlers from Illinois
Sportspeople from Chicago
NXT Women's Tag Team Champions